The Trust (1993) is an American film depicting the story of William Marsh Rice's mysterious death in 1900 and the people involved with it.

Premise
William Marsh Rice is murdered by a reputable lawyer named Albert T. Patrick, who claimed Mr. Rice had died in his sleep. The movie focuses on Mr. Patrick's actions after the crime as well as the investigation led by James Baker.

Production
The story is based partially in fact but has elements taken from theories developed through the years. William Marsh Rice's legacy is the prestigious Rice University located in Houston, Texas. The film was shot on location at the university and the Houston surrounding area. It was produced by Quadrangle Productions and co-directed by Neil Havens and Douglas Kilgore, who also wrote the screenplay based on his own play.

Cast
 Karen Black as Maria Vandermmeer
 Sam Bottoms as James Baker
 Jim Bernhard as Mr.Swenson
 Jon Bruno as Albert Patrick
 Charles Charpiot as Captain McKlusky
 Valerie Davis as Joy
 Luis Lemus as James Osborne
 Joseph 'Chepe' Lockett as Bank Manager
 Michael Lorre as Charlie Jones (as Michael Petty)
 Alan Martin as Graduate
 Leon Alvarado as Graduate 2 (uncredited)
 Glay Posch as Saloon Singer
 Troy Reynolds as Bailiff
 Suzanne Savoy as Alice Graham Baker
 Randel B. Smith as Bank Clerk
 Harold Suggs as William Marsh Rice
 Maurice Tuttle as Secretary to James Baker
 David Campbell as Attorney (uncredited)
 Delores Wheeler as Attorney's Wife
 Greg Lawson as Pallbearer (uncredited)
 Tamer Riad as Reporter (uncredited)

References

External links

1993 films
1990s crime films
1993 drama films